John Philip Weinel (February 23, 1916 – February 16, 2004) was an admiral in the United States Navy.

Early life
Weinel was born on 1916 in Columbia, Illinois. He attended public schools in Columbia and enrolled for a year at Illinois State University. He graduated in 1939 from the U.S. Naval Academy.

Military career

World War II
After becoming a naval aviator, he served in the Composite Squadron 33 and Fighter Squadron 22, and commanded the Fighter Squadron 14. He also served as an Amphibious Staff Officer and as Executive Staff Officer of Carrier Air Group 5.

Korean War
Weinel served on board the aircraft carrier . During the Korean War, he served as an air officer on the aircraft carrier .

Post war
From 1956 to 1957, he served in the Carrier Division 5 and from 1961 to 1962, he commanded the ammunition ship .
He next commanded the aircraft carrier  from 1963 to 1964. Weinel was assigned to the Navy Command Center in the Pentagon from 1967 to 1969.

Vietnam War
During the Vietnam War, Weinel served as the served as the commander of the Carrier Division 3 and a task group commander.

Post war
On 1 August 1970, he was promoted to Vice Admiral and on 2 August 1974, he was promoted to Admiral. Weinel served six tours of duty in the Pentagon. His assignments included Director of Political-Military Affairs (Navy), Director of Strategic Plan (Navy), Assistant Deputy Chief of Naval Operations, Director of Plans for the Joint Chiefs of Staff and Assistant to the Chairman of the Joint Chiefs of Staff.

From 1974 to 1977, he was a U.S. Military Representative to the NATO Military Committee. He retired from military service in 1977.

Later life
Weinel and wife Ann had three children, and several grand and great-grandchildren. After his retirement from the navy, he was an international champion pigeon racer and breeder.

He died in 2004 and was buried at the Saint Paul Evangelical Cemetery in Columbia, Illinois.

Awards and decorations

References

1916 births
2004 deaths
United States Navy admirals
NATO military personnel
People from Columbia, Illinois
Military personnel from Illinois
Aviators from Illinois
United States Naval Aviators
NATO Defense College alumni
United States Naval Academy alumni
United States Navy personnel of World War II
United States Navy personnel of the Korean War
United States Navy personnel of the Vietnam War
Recipients of the Defense Distinguished Service Medal
Recipients of the Navy Distinguished Service Medal
Recipients of the Legion of Merit
Recipients of the Air Medal
Recipients of the National Order of Vietnam
Recipients of the Gallantry Cross (Vietnam)
Burials in Illinois
United States Navy pilots of World War II